Cleric's Challenge is an adventure for the 2nd edition of the Advanced Dungeons & Dragons fantasy role-playing game, published in 1993.

Contents
The module is primarily designed for a priest or cleric of levels 2 to 4.

Publication history
The module was written by L. Richard Baker III and published by TSR.

Reception
Keith H. Eisenbeis reviewed Cleric's Challenge in a 1994 issue of White Wolf. On a scale of 1 to 5, he rated the module a 2 for Complexity and Value, a 3 for Appearance and Concepts, and a 4 for Playability. He stated, "All-in-all, this is a good adventure, and it should be valuable to players of priest characters." Overall, Eisenbeis rated it a 3 out of 5.

References

Dungeons & Dragons modules
Role-playing game supplements introduced in 1993